Up to the Neck is a 1933 British comedy film directed by Jack Raymond and starring Ralph Lynn, Winifred Shotter and Francis Lister. It was made at British and Dominion's Elstree Studios.

Plot
Shy bank clerk Norman B. Good comes into a big inheritance and uses it to realise his ambition to be a theatre impresario. Falling for chorus girl April Dawne, he invests most of his money in an expensive show designed to make her a star. When the production is a disaster, Norman takes to the stage in a desperate bid to improve the play by playing the lead. His monocle and toothy grin win him raves as a comic genius (despite the fact that he was playing the role straight), and the show becomes a hit as a comedy.

Cast
 Ralph Lynn as Norman B. Good  
 Winifred Shotter as April Dawne  
 Francis Lister as Eric Warwick 
 Reginald Purdell as Jimmy Catlin  
 Mary Brough as Landlady  
 Marjorie Hume as Vera Dane  
 Grizelda Harvey as Miss Fish

References

Bibliography
 Low, Rachael. Filmmaking in 1930s Britain. George Allen & Unwin, 1985.
 Wood, Linda. British Films, 1927-1939. British Film Institute, 1986.

External links

1933 films
British comedy films
1933 comedy films
1930s English-language films
Films directed by Jack Raymond
British black-and-white films
British and Dominions Studios films
Films shot at Imperial Studios, Elstree
1930s British films